Márta Rudas ( Antal; 14 February 1937 – 6 June 2017) was a Hungarian javelin thrower. She competed at the 1960, 1964 and 1968 Olympics and finished in ninth, second and fourth place, respectively.

References

1937 births
2017 deaths
Hungarian female javelin throwers
Olympic silver medalists for Hungary
Athletes (track and field) at the 1960 Summer Olympics
Athletes (track and field) at the 1964 Summer Olympics
Athletes (track and field) at the 1968 Summer Olympics
Olympic athletes of Hungary
Place of birth missing
Medalists at the 1964 Summer Olympics
Olympic silver medalists in athletics (track and field)
Sportspeople from Debrecen